Despaxia is a genus of rolled-winged stoneflies in the family Leuctridae. There are at least two described species in Despaxia.

Species
These two species belong to the genus Despaxia:
 Despaxia asiatica Zwick, 2010
 Despaxia augusta (Banks, 1907) (autumn needlefly)

References

Further reading

 
 

Plecoptera
Articles created by Qbugbot